Mount Oso is a mountain in Western Stanislaus County, California, and is located on the Diablo Range. At  feet in elevation, it is the third highest point in Stanislaus County. There are many radio stations and an unused forest fire lookout tower on the mountain.  It appears in the City of Modesto's logo due to its predominance in the area's skyline.

History

Mount Oso, (oso - Spanish for bear), was probably discovered by 
Gabriel Moraga during his expeditions in the Central Valley. This mountain can clearly 
be seen in Modesto, California, and has a beautiful contrast with the almond orchards. There is no exact date of the first ascent of the mountain.

Location

The mountain is in Western Stanislaus County, 10 miles west of Westley, California, and is not accessible to the public due to surrounding gated private property.

References

External links
 

Mountains of Stanislaus County, California
Diablo Range
Geography of the San Joaquin Valley
Mountains of Northern California